The 2024 United States Senate election in New Jersey will be held on November 5, 2024, to elect a member of the United States Senate to represent the state of New Jersey. Incumbent three-term Democratic Senator Bob Menendez was re-elected with 54.0% of the vote in 2018.

Democratic primary

Candidates

Declared
 Christina Khalil, social worker
 Joe Signorello, mayor of Roselle Park and nominee for the 21st Senate district in 2021

Publicly expressed interest
 Bob Menendez, incumbent U.S. senator

Republican primary

Candidates

Declared
 Daniel Cruz, teacher, former member of the Andover Township Board of Education, and candidate for the 24th Senate district in 2021
 Shirley Maia-Cusick, immigration consulting firm owner

Independents

Candidates

Declared
 Nicholas Carducci

General election

Predictions

References

External links
Campaign finance at FEC

Official campaign websites
Daniel "Dan" Cruz (R) for Senate
Shirley Maia-Cusick (R) for Senate
Bob Menendez (D) for Senate
Joe Signorello (D) for Senate
Christina Khalil (D) for Senate

2024
New Jersey
United States Senate